Pterolophia beccarii is a species of beetle in the family Cerambycidae. It was described by Charles Joseph Gahan in 1907.

References

beccarii
Beetles described in 1907